The 1997–98 Hellenic Football League season was the 45th in the history of the Hellenic Football League, a football competition in England.

Premier Division

The Premier Division featured 16 clubs which competed in the division last season, along with two new clubs, promoted from Division One:
Hallen
Harrow Hill

League table

Division One

Division One featured 15 clubs which competed in the division last season, along with two new clubs:
Cirencester Academy
Watlington

League table

References

External links
 Hellenic Football League

1997-98
8